Siri Andersson-Palmestav (17 December 1903 – 6 March 2002) was a Swedish writer and missionary.

She was born in Gävle Parish, became a student, studying at Betelseminariet in Stockholm and at the Örebro School of Theology. She worked as missionary between 1928 and 1962 in Estonia, Poland and Germany. Andersson described in her books a martyrdom of Christians in communist Russia.

In 1957, she married Jakob Palmestav (1896–1981).

Works 
  (1942)
  (1945)
  (1946)
  (1949)
  (1958)
  (1961)
  (1963)
  (1964)
  (1965)
  (1965)
  (1967)
  (1967)
  (1971)
  (1975)
  (1982)
  (1986)

References 

1903 births
2002 deaths
Swedish women writers
Women religious writers
Swedish spiritual writers
Christian writers
Christian missionaries in Germany
Christian missionaries in Estonia
Christian missionaries in Finland
Female Christian missionaries
Swedish Christian missionaries